General elections were held in Namibia on 27–28 November 2009. They were the fourth general elections since independence and the fifth democratic elections. Voting ended on 28 November and official election results, released on 4 December, showed that Hifikepunye Pohamba and his SWAPO Party were re-elected, each with over 75% of the vote. Prior to the election, the South West Africa People's Organization (SWAPO) was widely expected to score a landslide victory, with the Rally for Democracy and Progress (RDP) considered SWAPO's biggest challenger. Fourteen political parties competed for seats in the National Assembly of Namibia, and twelve candidates ran for the Presidency.

Parties

SWAPO
The ruling SWAPO party set a goal of winning all 72 seats in the National Assembly and controlling the NA "until the second coming of Jesus Christ". At the SWAPO party congress in November 2007, current President Hifikepunye Pohamba was elected President of SWAPO and also received the party's nomination for President in 2009. SWAPO ended up winning 54 seats, a one-seat loss from the third National Assembly.

RDP
This was the first general election for the Rally for Democracy and Progress. The party's nominee for President was Hidipo Hamutenya, a former government minister of SWAPO. The RDP was considered the main opposition to the ruling SWAPO. It gained eight seats in the National Assembly and became the Official Opposition.

NUDO
On 16 October 2009, the National Unity Democratic Organisation (NUDO) was the first political party to officially submit their candidate, Kuaima Riruako, for President.

Observers
The National Society for Human Rights' observer status was withdrawn by the electoral commission, which said it was "not impartial". The organisation said it would approach the High Court to contest the decision; the court later ordered the commission to reinstate the organisation.

Procedure
Though the country planned to buy electronic voting machines from India sometime in 2009, the Electoral Commission assured the National Assembly that they would not be used in the 2009 elections.

Results

President
Hifikepunye Pohamba was re-elected as President of Namibia with 611,241 votes, more than six times as many as Hamutenya, his nearest rival, received.

National Assembly

By region

Delay controversy 
Final results were announced on 4 December, the longest delay between voting and the publication of results of any Namibian election (6 days).  The Electoral Commission of Namibia (ECN) blamed the delay on a recent amendment to the Electoral Act which had caused "logistical nightmares [they had] never experienced before" and a "cumbersome" verification process.  The ECN had received criticism from political parties, civil societies and the general public for the delay. Following publication of the results, 8 of the 13 opposition parties stated that they did not accept the results and were instructing their lawyers to challenge the ECN in court "for contravening the electoral law of the country". Electoral observers have pronounced the polls to be free and fair but recommended that the ECN speed up the counting process and free up access to the media for all parties.

Accuracy controversy 
The accuracy of the results of this election has been questioned, not only by the defeated opposition parties but also by the Namibian Society of Human Rights (NSHR). The voters roll was the main subject of contention, having contained 1 181 835 entries at the time of first publication six weeks prior to the election but shrinking to 820 305 entries within a matter of days. Also the voter turnout has been questioned as there were a number of constituencies that had a turnout of over 100%, on top of the list Windhoek East with 191%, Okatyali with 189%, and Ohangwena with 175%. Further "minor" concerns were people being allowed to vote on behalf of someone else, voters asked to disclose their political affiliation at polling stations, and people allowed to vote twice.

References

External links

Electoral Commission of Namibia, official website
Namibia Elections 2009 – Party lists, Manifestos, News, Comment and Analysis!
Namibia Election Results 2009
Namibia Elections 2009 Key Dates

Presidential elections in Namibia
Election, general
Namibia
Elections in Namibia
National Assembly (Namibia)
November 2009 events in Africa